Annunzio Paolo Mantovani (15 November 1905 – 29 March 1980) was an Anglo-Italian conductor, composer and light orchestra-styled entertainer with a cascading strings musical signature.

The book British Hit Singles & Albums stated that he was "Britain's most successful album act before the Beatles ... the first act to sell over one million stereo albums and [have] six albums simultaneously in the US Top 30 in 1959".

Biography
Mantovani was born in Venice, Italy, into a musical family. His father, Benedetto Paolo "Bismarck" Mantovani, was a violinist and served as the concertmaster of La Scala opera house's orchestra in Milan, under the baton of Arturo Toscanini. The family moved to England in 1912, where young Annunzio studied at Trinity College of Music in London. After graduation, he formed his own orchestra, which played in and around Birmingham. He married Winifred Moss in 1934, having two children: Kenneth (born 12 July 1935) and Paula Irene (born 11 April 1939).  By the time World War II broke out, his orchestra was one of the most popular British dance bands, both on BBC radio broadcasts and in live performances.

He was also musical director for a large number of musicals and other plays, including Noël Coward's Pacific 1860 (1946) and Vivian Ellis's musical setting of J. B. Fagan's And So to Bed (1951). After the war, he concentrated on recording, and eventually gave up live performance altogether. He worked with arranger and composer Ronald "Ronnie" Binge, who developed the "cascading strings" effect (also known as the "Mantovani sound"). His records were regularly used for demonstration purposes in stores selling hi-fi stereo equipment, as they were produced and arranged for stereo reproduction. He became the first person to sell a million stereophonic records. In 1952, Binge ceased to arrange for Mantovani but the distinctive sound of the orchestra remained.

Mantovani recorded for Decca and London Records the US arm of the Decca Record Company, exclusively. He recorded in excess of 50 albums on that label, many of which were Top 40 hits.  His single tracks included "The Song from Moulin Rouge", which reached number one in the UK Singles Chart in 1953; "Cara Mia" (with him and his orchestra backing David Whitfield) in 1954; "Around the World" in 1957; and "Main Theme from Exodus (Ari's Theme)" in 1960. In the United States, between 1955 and 1972, he released more than 40 albums with 27 reaching the "Top 40", and 11 in the "Top Ten". His biggest success came with the album Film Encores, which attained number one in 1957.

Similarly, Mantovani Plays Music From 'Exodus' and Other Great Themes made it to the Top Ten in 1961, with over one million albums sold.

Mantovani starred in his own syndicated television series, Mantovani, which was produced in England and which aired in the United States in 1959. Thirty-nine episodes were filmed. Mantovani made his last recordings in the mid-1970s.

He died at a care home in Royal Tunbridge Wells Kent. His funeral was held at the Kent and Sussex Crematorium and Cemetery on 8 April 1980.

Music style and influences
The cascading strings technique developed by Binge became Mantovani's hallmark in such hits arranged by Binge as "Charmaine". Binge developed this technique to replicate the echo experienced in venues such as cathedrals and he achieved this goal through arranging skill alone.

Author Joseph Lanza describes Mantovani's string arrangements as the most "rich and mellifluous" of the emerging light music style during the early 1950s.  He stated that Mantovani was a leader in the use of new studio technologies to "create sound tapestries with innumerable strings", and that "the sustained hum of Mantovani's reverberated violins produced a sonic vaporizer foreshadowing the synthesizer harmonics of space music." His style survived through an ever-changing variety of musical styles prompting Variety to call him "the biggest musical phenomenon of the twentieth century".

From 1961 to 1971, David McCallum Sr was leader of Mantovani's orchestra. At this time, his son David McCallum Jr was at the height of his fame, prompting Mantovani to introduce his leader to audiences with the quip, "We can afford the father but not the son!"

Mantovani is referred to by name in The Kinks song "Prince of the Punks". He also had a big influence on Brian May, Queen guitarist.

During his lifetime, Mantovani did not always get respect from his fellow musicians. When George Martin first suggested overdubbing Paul McCartney's recording of "Yesterday" with strings, McCartney's initial reaction, according to Martin, was that he did not want it sounding like Mantovani. Martin therefore used a more classical sound, employing a string quartet.

Posthumous publishing
Much of his catalogue has reappeared on CD. There are also many compilations. A large number of CDs are available containing unauthorised recordings, billed as Mantovani or Mantovani Orchestra, for example the CD titled "The Mantovani Orchestra" released in 1997 contained a track from the 1980s Andrew Lloyd Webber musical "Cats", which would have required posthumous conducting on the part of Mantovani. There have also been CDs released under the Mantovani name of recordings made by others while Mantovani was still alive.

Following Mantovani's death in 1980, the Mantovani Estate continues to authorise numerous concerts worldwide and recordings using original and newly commissioned arrangements.

Discography

Albums

A Mantovani Program, London LPB-127, 1949
Musical Moments, London LPB-218, 1950
Waltzing with Mantovani, London LPB-381, 1951
Strauss Waltzes, London  LL 685, 1953, later re-recorded in stereo as London 118, 1958
The Music of Victor Herbert, London  LL 746, 1953
An Album of Favorite Melodies, reissued as An Enchanted Evening with Mantovani, London LL 766, 1953
An Album of Romantic Melodies, London LL 979, 1954
Plays The Music of Sigmund Romberg, London LL 1031, 1954
Song Hits from Theatreland, London LL 1219, 1955, later re-recorded in stereo as London 125, 1959
Plays The Music of Rudolf Friml, London LL 1150, 1955
Plays The Immortal Classics, London LL 877, 1956
Music from the Films, London 112
Waltz Encores, London 119
Film Encores, London 124, 1957
Gems Forever, London 106, 1958
Continental Encores, London 147, 1959.
Film Encores, Vol. 2, London 164, 1959
The Music of Victor Herbert and Sigmund Romberg, London 165, 1960
The Music of Irving Berlin and Rudolf Friml, London 166, 1956
The Breeze, London, Abbey road, 1961
American Scene, London 182
Songs to Remember, London 193, 1960
Great Theme Music (Music from "Exodus"), London 224, 1961
Theme from "Carnival", London 3250, 1961
Themes from Broadway, London 242
American Waltzes, London 248
Moon River, London 249, 1962
Selections from "Stop the World – I Want to Get Off" and "Oliver", London 270
Latin Rendezvous, London 295
Manhattan, London 328, 1963
Folk Songs Around the World, London 360
The Incomparable Mantovani, London 392
The Mantovani Sound, London 419, 1965
Mantovani Olé, London 422
Mantovani Magic, London 448, 1966
Mantovani's Golden Hits, London 483, 1967
Mr. Music, London 474, 1966
Mantovani/Hollywood, London 516
The Mantovani Touch, London 526, 1968
Mantovani/Tango, London 532
Mantovani ... Memories, London 542
The Mantovani Scene, London 548, 1969

The World of Mantovani, London 565, 1969
Mantovani Today, London 572, 1970
From Monty with Love, London 585–586, 1971
To Lovers Everywhere, London PS 598, 1971
Annunzio Paolo Mantovani, London XPS 610, 1972
An Evening with Mantovani, London 902, 1973
The Greatest Gift Is Love, London 913, 1975
Mantovani Magic, K-tel, NA603
Mantovani's Hit Parade , London 1966

Light classical music
Strauss Waltzes, London LL 685, 1953
Strauss Waltzes, London 118 1958
Concert Encores, London 133
Operetta Memories, London 202
Italia Mia, London 232, 1961
Classical Encores, London 269
The World's Great Love Songs, London 280
Mantovani in Concert, London 578

Christmas and religious music
Christmas Carols (mono), London LL913, 1954
Songs of Praise, London 245
Christmas Greetings, London 338
Christmas Carols (stereo), London PS142
Merry Christmas to All of You, Decca 66445009 (1963)

Singles

Selected filmography
 Sing as You Swing (1937)
 Guitars of Love (1954)
 A Heart Full of Music (1955)

See also
Mononymous persons

References

External links
Official Mantovani website

1905 births
1980 deaths
20th-century classical musicians
20th-century Italian conductors (music)
20th-century Italian composers
Dance band bandleaders
Easy listening musicians
Entertainments National Service Association personnel
Italian classical musicians
Italian male conductors (music)
Italian emigrants to the United Kingdom
Italian male composers
Italian music arrangers
Light music composers
London Records artists
Musicians from Venice
20th-century Italian male musicians